Grace is an unincorporated community in Silver Bow County, in the U.S. state of Montana.

History
Grace contained a post office between 1882 and 1926. The community was named for Grace Penfield, the wife of a railroad official.

References

Unincorporated communities in Silver Bow County, Montana
Unincorporated communities in Montana